is the fourth and final album by the Japanese visual kei rock band Malice Mizer, released on August 23, 2000. The title roughly translates as "Church of Roses" or "Sanctuary of Roses". In February 2007, Bara no Seidou was re-released by German record label Trisol Music Group, packaged in both jewel case and limited slipcase versions, both including the Cardinal music video collection DVD.

Influences
Bara no Seidou is a major change from Malice Mizer's previous albums with less of a focus on the twin guitar sound that was present in their previous discography, but retaining a chameleon trait like artists such as Genesis and Roxy Music. The band's sound switched from an ordinary art rock sound into a dark, gothic metal one; however, they still continued to use the violins, harpsichords and other instruments present in their older works and also added in a pipe organ and a choir for a haunting, melancholic, and religious feel to the album. For example, the song "Seinaru Toki Eien no Inori" is based around an organ and choir but still includes dual guitars and drums, which gives it a gothic metal feel. Fan favorite "Kyomu no Naka de no Yuugi" is a track that uses an organ and harpsichord mixed with a synthesizer and drum machine for more of a dark wave element. This song is influenced by gothic rock/industrial music and features a different image in its video, but still retains the dark themes of the album.

After the death of Kami, it could be argued that the "funeral goth" element present in their attire is because of his death, and the song "Saikai no Chi to Bara" is a reference, and tribute, to him.

Live promotion
The band released the DVD Bara ni Irodorareta Akui to Higeki no Makuake of their two-day live concert at the Nippon Budokan. Like their previous tour, "Merveilles L'Espace", this tour was very theatrical, having a Gothic cathedral on the cover of the album as a stage prop and a moon that changed colors several times during the performance. However, unlike the previous tours, it did not completely consist of the members playing their instruments and relied more on the theatrics.

Track listing

Personnel
 Mana – guitar on 2, 4, 8, and 9, synthesizer, drum machine on 3–7
 Közi – guitar on 2, 4, 8, and 9, synthesizer, vocals on 3 (distorted), 6 (backing and distorted) and 10 (whispered), drum machine on 3–7
 Yu~ki – bass guitar, vocals on 3 (distorted) and 10 (whispered), drum machine on 3–7
 Shu – drums
 Klaha – vocals on 2, 4, 5, 6, 8 and 9
 Maki Okada – vocals on 2
 Youko Takai – vocals on 7
 Yuichiro Goto – strings on 2, violin on 4, 9 and 10
 Motohide Tanaka – director
 Masao Nakazato – mastering
 Teruhisa Abe – art direction, design
 Kenji Tsukagoshi – photography
 Taqueya Yamashita – cover art
 Yukie Itoh – executive producer
 Kami – "eternal blood relative"

References

2000 albums
Malice Mizer albums